Rossnowlagh is a seaside village in the south of County Donegal, Ireland.

Beach
Rossnowlagh is one of Ireland's and Europe's best Blue Flag surfing beaches. As the slowly rising beach faces westward into the Atlantic Ocean, and the fact that Donegal Bay has a funnel-like shape, it can increase the size of the waves, especially in winter when some large rollers are generated and it has been known to have waves up to 7 metres (20 ft) high.

Rossnowlagh has many visitors during the summer months and most of the beach is accessible by car. There is sometimes a 'beach warden' on duty and information about tidal risks may be displayed.

According to a soil erosion study of the beach at Rossnowlagh, known officially as Belalt Strand, the area consists mainly of sandy beaches, but also rocky shore platforms, sand dunes, grassland, boulder clay cliffs and rock cliffs. As of the second half of the 20th century, it was determined that the central section of the dune front was eroding at rates up to 0.6 metres (2 ft) per year, with the highest erosion rate between 1951 and 1977.

The beach was the setting for the recording of the music video for Nathan Carter's version of Wagon Wheel.

Public transport access
The Seirbhís Iompair Tuaithe Teoranta (SITT) Rural Transport/ Locallink Donegal Donegal Town to Ballyshannon route serves Rossnowlagh every day. Onward connections are available at Ballyshannon such as Ulsterbus for example.  The nearest railway station is Sligo railway station. Bus Éireann services from Ballyshannon serve Sligo bus station which is located beside the railway station.

Amenities
The main amenity is the extensive beach which is frequented by walkers, joggers, sunbathers, surfers, windsurfers, kite-surfers, doggers and swimmers, and is accessible by car via 3 ramps. There is about 3 km (2 miles) of wide sandy beach although it is possible to walk several more kilometres further along the shore and all the way to Murvagh Beach.There is a children's playground at the main car park constructed in 2022.

The Sandhouse Hotel is located adjacent to the beach, with a 'surfers bar' attached. Overlooking the beach and on the cliff is the Smuggler's Creek Inn restaurant and bar, and there are several shops in the area, along with a post office and shop near the Franciscan Friary as well as The Thatch Tea House nearby.

The Franciscan Friary is located up from the southern end of the beach. The Friary has a visitor centre and contains the Donegal Historical Society Museum which houses a small collection including stone age flints and old Irish musical instruments. The friary also has gardens that are open to visitors.

To the southwest further along the cliffs, in the distance stands the ruined Kilbarron Castle which is accessible via Creevy.

Events

 Rossnowlagh Surf Club hosts several surfing events, some with dozens of young surfers competing. For example, competitions are held for U12, U14 and U16 age groups.
 The annual Orange Order parade for the County Donegal Orange Lodge is held each year in Rossnowlagh, usually on the Saturday before 12 July. The number of participants and marching bands varies each year, with most marchers coming from Order lodges based in Northern Ireland, but some come from other parts of County Donegal or come up from Counties Monaghan and Cavan. There is no lodge in Rossnowlagh itself. The participants begin near St John's Church and march for approximately 2 km (1¼ miles) into the centre of Rossnowlagh, where they congregate for some time. The marchers march back to St John's Church area in the late afternoon.
 The Irish National Junior Surfing Championships have been hosted in Rossnowlagh, such as in 2007 where 113 young surfers competed for titles in U12, U14, U16 and U18 levels, including events for bodyboard and longboard.
 An annual Feis (Irish Gaelic: pronounced fesh) is held each summer in July or August at the Franciscan Friary in Rossnowlagh. One of the Four Masters, Michael O'Cleirigh, comes from a nearby locality.
 The Inter-Counties Surfing contest is Ireland's longest-running surfing contest and has been held every year since 1969. As it is normally the last surfing event of the year in Ireland, held in September or October, it is widely viewed as a social event of the surfing calendar.
 The World Rally Championship came to the Rossnowlagh area in 2007 and again in 2009. Rally Ireland organised both events. The rally which drew a large number of spectators was held in the townland of Cashel on the northern edge of Rossnowlagh and was labelled the Donegal Bay stage. This special stage was 14 km (9 miles) long on narrow single-lane tarmac back roads. In 2007 it was won by Jari-Matti Latvala and in 2009 by Mikko Hirvonen. Sébastien Loeb was the overall winner of both rallies.

History

Franciscan Friary
There had been 500 years of Franciscan history in Donegal when the link was broken in the mid-19th century. However, the Franciscan order re-established itself in County Donegal when new friary buildings were built in Rossnowlagh in the early 1950s. The land for the Friary was donated by Charles Williamson to his brother and Franciscan, Brother Paschal Williamson.

Rail transport
Rossnowlagh railway station opened in 1905 but closed on 1 January 1960.  It was part of the County Donegal Railways Joint Committee network with the train running towards Ballyshannon (where a walk across the town to the other station in Ballyshannon run by the Great Northern Railway of Ireland, would be required for Bundoran or Enniskillen) to the south and north to Donegal Town, Stranorlar, Strabane (where passengers could change onto the Great Northern Railway of Ireland, to reach Omagh) and Derry. During the 55 years of its operation, Rossnowlagh, with its 2 miles of beach, became a popular venue for excursionists and families on their annual outings.

Bus transport

Between 1999 and 2000 Bus Éireann route 484 served Rossnowlagh on Fridays only linking it to Ballyshannon for onward connections. Rossnowlagh had a regular daily bus service until the late 1980s.

People
Easkey Britton – surfer, scientist, born Rossnowlagh

See also
 List of towns and villages in Ireland
 List of abbeys and priories in Ireland (County Donegal)
 Surfing in Ireland

References

External links
 Donegal Bay
  History of the Franciscans in Donegal
Rossnowlagh Surf Club

Beaches of County Donegal
Surfing locations in Ireland
Tourist attractions in County Donegal
Towns and villages in County Donegal